Gåsmamman is a Swedish drama series that started airing on C More Series in November 2015. The lead role is played by Alexandra Rapaport. The series premiered on Kanal5 on 18 February 2016. The series is based on the Dutch drama series Penoza  from 2010 created by Pieter Bart Korthuis and Diederik van Rooijen. There is also an American version of the series from 2013, called Red Widow.

The story focuses on Sonja (Alexandra Rapaport) who lives a carefree life with her family near Stockholm and works as an accountant in the family business at the marina. One day Sonja is drawn into the criminal underworld to save her family.

Originally the show was released on a movie channel and SVOD platform C More, with a terrestrial release the following year on Kanal 5. TV 4, the parent company of C More took over the terrestrial right with season 4.

Alexandra Rapaport won the 2017 Kristallen Award 2017 for the Best Female Role in a Television Production for Gåsmamman.

Cast
 Alexandra Rapaport – Sonja Ek
 Magnus Roosmann – Fredrik Ek
 Edvin Ryding – Linus Ek
 Clara Christiansson – Nina Ek
 Shebly Niavarani – Emil Svensson
 Christian Svensson – Barry
 Tommy Körberg – Anders Nordin
 Joel Lützow – Gustav Ek
 Grynet Molvig – Klara Nordin
 Anja Lundkvist – Kattis Berg Antonsen
 Ulf Friberg – Lukas Sandrini
 Allan Svensson - Henrik Östling
 Ivan Mathias Petersson – Niklas Nordin
 Morgan Alling – Simon Svart
 Rakel Wärmländer - Mimmi "Fickan" Olsson
 Anastasios Soulis - Zac
 Francisco Sobrado - Pinto Rosales
 Gustaf Hammarsten – Christian Broman
 Peshang Rad – Johan Nordin
 Bahador Foladi - "Speedy"
 Susanne Thorson – Magdalena Nordin
 Madeleine Barwén Trollvik – Felicia
 Andreas Kundler – Stein Berg Antonsen
 Oscar Foronda - "El Largo"
 Joakim Nätterqvist - Patrik Thorin (Joining cast with season 4)

References

External links

Kanal 5 (Swedish TV channel) original programming
2015 Swedish television series debuts
Television shows set in Sweden
Swedish-language television shows